Bridge in French Creek Township is a historic multi-span steel Pratt truss bridge located near the village of Carlton, Pennsylvania in French Creek Township, Mercer County, Pennsylvania. It was built in 1888 by the Columbia Bridge Works, and is a  bridge with two spans.  It crosses French Creek.

During the summer of 2014 the bridge was removed, disassembled and placed in storage pending restoration and reuse.  A modern bridge replaced it at the crossing.

It was listed on the National Register of Historic Places in 1988.

References 

Road bridges on the National Register of Historic Places in Pennsylvania
Bridges in Mercer County, Pennsylvania
National Register of Historic Places in Mercer County, Pennsylvania
Steel bridges in the United States
Pratt truss bridges in the United States